Sheng Zhongliang (August 27, 1907 – March 29, 2007) was a member of the 28 Bolsheviks. He was born in Shimen County, Hubei. He studied at Moscow Sun Yat-sen University in the Soviet Union. He returned to China in January 1933. In August 1934, Li Zhusheng, another member of the 28 Bolsheviks was captured by the Kuomintang and defected, resulting in Sheng's capture on October 4, 1934. On the advice of Gu Shunzhang, another former member of the Communist Party of China who had defected to the Kuomintang in 1931, Sheng himself joined the Kuomintang. As a member of the foreign ministry of the Nationalist Government, Sheng served as the Republic of China Ambassador to Uruguay and Iraq.

References
中共历史上最危险叛徒 毛泽东亲自签发通缉令. 中国网. [2012-06-02].
"二十八个半布尔什维克"与一对叛徒. 中国广播网. [2012-06-02].

1907 births
2007 deaths
Moscow Sun Yat-sen University alumni
Ambassadors of the Republic of China
Chinese Communist Party politicians from Hunan
Republic of China politicians from Hunan
Politicians from Changde
Kuomintang politicians in Taiwan